Ousmane Diarra (born 30 September 1966) is a retired Malian athlete who competed in sprinting events. He competed at three consecutive Summer Olympics, beginning in 1988, in addition to five outdoor World Championships.

Competition record

Personal bests
Outdoor
100 metres – 10.10 (+1.2 m/s) (Athens 1996)
200 metres – 20.98 (Harare 1995)
Indoor
60 metres – 6.63 (Atlanta 1996)

References

1966 births
Living people
Malian male sprinters
Athletes (track and field) at the 1988 Summer Olympics
Athletes (track and field) at the 1992 Summer Olympics
Athletes (track and field) at the 1996 Summer Olympics
Olympic athletes of Mali
World Athletics Championships athletes for Mali
21st-century Malian people